Álvaro Muñoz may refer to:

 Álvaro Muñoz (footballer) (born 1954), Colombian footballer
 Álvaro Muñoz (basketball) (born 1990), Spanish basketball player